was a Japanese film director and screenwriter. He was first a director of television commercials before adding filmmaking to his creative activities. His most famous film outside Japan was Tony Takitani, an adaptation of a short story by Haruki Murakami. He died of a cerebral hemorrhage after suddenly collapsing at a restaurant, shortly before his latest film, Buy a Suit, was to premier at the Tokyo International Film Festival.

Filmography
 Buy A Suit (2008)
 How to Become Myself (2007)
 Aogeba Tôtoshi (2006)
 Tony Takitani (2004)
 Ryoma's Wife, Her Husband and Her Lover (2002)
 Tokyo Marigold (2001)
 Zawa-zawa Shimo-Kitazawa (2000)
 Osaka Story (1999)
 Tadon to Chikuwa (1998)
 Tokyo Lullaby (1997)
 Tokiwa: The Manga Apartment (1996)
 The Tokyo Siblings (1995)
 Kurêpu (1993)
 Dying at a Hospital (1993)
 Kin Chan no Cinema Jack (1993) (segment "Kitto Kurusa")
 Tugumi (1990)
 No Life King (1989)
 Kaisha monogatari: Memories of You (1988)
 Bu Su (1987)

References

External links

1948 births
2008 deaths
Japanese film directors
People from Western Tokyo
20th-century Japanese screenwriters